Parliamentary elections were held in Syria to elect the People's Council on 13 April 2016, electing members for the 2016–2020 parliamentary term.

Background

Amidst nearly five years of civil war and ensuing negotiations for a ceasefire, following the Russian military intervention in the Syrian Civil War and Syrian Arab Army gains, President Bashar al-Assad called the election.

At the time of the election, Idlib Governorate was almost entirely outside government control, as it was controlled by rebels. Raqqa Governorate and Deir ez-Zor Governorate were mostly occupied by ISIL. As such, elections did not take place in these provinces. Parts of Aleppo, Homs, and Daraa governorates were also held by anti-government forces at the time of the election. Rojava had also been semi-autonomous since the civil war began.

Electoral system
All 250 members of the People's Council were elected from 15 multi-member constituencies in general tickets.

Results
The Ba'ath Party-led National Progressive Front won 200 of the 250 seats, while the opposition inside and outside the country boycotted the elections; voter turnout was 57.56%. Two Armenians were elected to the People's Council.

Reactions
 – Martin Schaefer, spokesman for the Foreign Ministry has announced that Germany would not accept the results of the election. He stated that "holding free and fair elections is simply impossible in the current situation, with all the refugees, in a full civil war situation."
 – John Kirby, spokesman for the United States Department of State has announced that the United States believes the elections to not be credible, fair or free. He cited the departure of many citizens as a result of the Syrian Civil War.

References

2016 in the Syrian civil war
Parliamentary elections in Syria
Syria
2016 in Syria
Election and referendum articles with incomplete results